is a Japanese goalball player who won a gold medal at the 2012 Summer Paralympics.

She was 13 years old when she developed fibrous dysplasia which led to vision loss. She began playing goalball in 2010 at age 15.

References 

Paralympic gold medalists for Japan
Goalball players at the 2012 Summer Paralympics
Goalball players at the 2016 Summer Paralympics
Sportspeople from Tokyo
People from Ōme, Tokyo
1995 births
Living people
Medalists at the 2012 Summer Paralympics
Paralympic goalball players of Japan
Female goalball players
Rikkyo University alumni
Paralympic medalists in goalball
Goalball players at the 2020 Summer Paralympics
21st-century Japanese women